Steven Mitchell Jr. (born May 2, 1994) is an American football wide receiver for the St. Louis BattleHawks of the XFL. He played college football at USC and signed with the Los Angeles Rams as an undrafted free agent in 2018. He played for the Houston Texans from 2018 to 2020.

Early years
Mitchell grew up in Pasadena and attended Bishop Alemany High School.

College career
He attended and played college football at the University of Southern California. His career at USC was marred by two knee injuries, but he was named Honorable Mention All-Pac-12 as a junior.

Professional career

Los Angeles Rams
After going undrafted in the 2018 NFL Draft, Mitchell signed with the Los Angeles Rams. Mitchell signed with the Los Angeles Rams as an undrafted free agent on May 2, 2018. He was waived on September 1, 2018 and was signed to the practice squad the next day. He was released on October 23, 2018.

Houston Texans
On October 29, 2018, Mitchell was signed to the Houston Texans' practice squad. He was promoted to the active roster on December 24, 2018. The Texans waived him on August 31, 2019, during final roster cuts. On September 1, 2019, Mitchell was signed to the Texans' practice squad. He was promoted to the active roster on October 23, 2019. He was waived on November 21, but re-signed two days later.

On September 5, 2020, Mitchell was waived by the Texans and signed to the practice squad the next day. He was elevated to the active roster on November 25, December 5, December 12, December 19, and December 26 for the team's weeks 12, 13, 14, 15, and 16 games against the Detroit Lions, Indianapolis Colts, Chicago Bears, Colts, and Cincinnati Bengals, and reverted to the practice squad after each game. On January 2, 2021, he was signed to the active roster. He was waived after the season on April 12, 2021.

References

External links
USC Trojans bio

1994 births
Living people
American football wide receivers
Houston Texans players
Los Angeles Rams players
Players of American football from Pasadena, California
St. Louis BattleHawks players
USC Trojans football players